Alexander James Thomson (born 22 December 1960) is a British television journalist and newscaster.

Education
Thomson was educated at the state comprehensive Cranbourne Secondary School, in Basingstoke, Hampshire, followed by University College, Oxford. In his gap year, he taught at Fyling Hall School. After graduating from University College, Oxford, with a First in English , Thomson gained a Postgraduate Diploma in Journalism from Cardiff University.

Life and career
Thomson has worked for the BBC in Northern Ireland. He has been with ITN's Channel 4 News since 1988 and is the longest-serving onscreen journalist on the programme. Since then he has won several Royal Television (RTS) Awards for domestic and foreign coverage and TV Journalist of the Year. His extensive foreign coverage has won BAFTA, Emmy and New York TV Festival awards down the years. He's worked  on extensive and award winning investigations in the UK on Bloody Sunday, Hillsborough, the Mull of Kintyre Chinook crash and Rangers FC. His  current role is Chief Correspondent and Presenter for Channel 4 News, produced by ITN. He has covered more than 20 wars and conflicts as well as other major international issues from climate change and natural disasters to global politics.

In June 2012, Alex Thomson's vehicle, in which he and other journalists were travelling while covering the Syrian uprising, came under fire and was forced to take evasive action. According to Thomson and others present, this was the result of a small group from the Free Syrian Army who intentionally attempted to have the team killed in no-man's land by the government forces as a propaganda stunt to discredit Damascus.

In 2012, Thomson turned his journalistic attention to the events associated with the administration and liquidation of Rangers FC, with Phil Mac Giolla Bhain concentrating on the tax avoidance and corporate governance issues of Rangers. Thomson produced a number of Channel 4 News reports as well as blog posts on this topic. He contributed the foreword to Phil Mac Giolla Bhain's book Downfall: How Rangers FC Self Destructed.

In addition to his broadcast journalism, he has written a travel book on cycling across India, Ram Ram India, published by Harper Collins India, Smokescreen: The Media, The Censors, The Gulf, about media coverage of Operation Desert Storm in the Gulf War, and numerous articles on media and wider issues relating to journalism.

Personal life
Thomson's partner is Sarah Spiller. They have twin sons and live in Essex. He is a supporter of Newcastle United of the English Premier League.

References

External links
 Biodata at Channel 4 website

ITN newsreaders and journalists
Alumni of University College, Oxford
1960 births
Living people
People from Essex
Alumni of Cardiff University